Penicillium adametzioides is an anamorph fungus species of the genus of Penicillium, which was isolated from decayed Grapes in Cheongsoo in Korea.

See also
List of Penicillium species

References

Further reading

 

adametzioides
Fungi described in 1963